Sarshiv District is a district (bakhsh) in Marivan County, Kurdistan Province, Iran. At the 2006 census, its population was 10,632, in 2,253 families.  The District has one city: Chenareh.  The District has two rural districts (dehestan): Gol-e Cheydar Rural District and Sarshiv Rural District.

References 

Marivan County
Districts of Kurdistan Province